Phyllonorycter diaphanella is a moth of the family Gracillariidae. It is known from Texas and Ohio in the United States.

The wingspan is about 6 mm.

The larvae feed on Quercus species, including Quercus bicolor and Quercus ilicifolia. They mine the leaves of their host plant. The mine has the form of a blotch mine on the underside of the leaf. The epidermis is wrinkled, so that the leaf is slightly bent. The parenchyma is entirely consumed, and the mine is transparent

References

diaphanella
Moths of North America
Moths described in 1878